Charles Jones was a Welsh lawyer and politician who sat in the House of Commons  at various times between 1624 and 1640.

Jones was the son of Sir William Jones  and his wife Margaret Griffith, daughter of Griffith ap John Griffith of Kevenamulch, Carnarvonshire. His father was a judge and MP. Jones was a barrister of Lincoln's Inn and was recorder of Beaumaris in 1625. In 1624, Jones was elected Member of Parliament for Beaumaris. He was re-elected to the seat in 1625, 1626 and 1628 when he sat until 1629 when King Charles decided to rule without parliament for eleven years. He and his brother William were joint prothonotaries and clerks of the crown for Denbighshire and Montgomeryshire but surrendered the positions in November 1636.

By 1640 Jones was recorder of Monmouth. In April 1640, he was elected MP for Beaumaris and for Monmouth Boroughs in the Short Parliament.
 
Jones was the proprietor of Castell-March.

References

 

Year of birth missing
Year of death missing
Members of the Parliament of England (pre-1707) for constituencies in Wales
17th-century Welsh politicians
English MPs 1624–1625
English MPs 1625
English MPs 1626
English MPs 1628–1629
English MPs 1640 (April)
Members of the Parliament of England for Beaumaris